The Aquarium of Boise is a 501 c(3) non-profit aquarium in Boise, Idaho, United States. It opened to the public in 2011.

History

The nonprofit organization that built and operates the Aquarium of Boise was founded in 2008. After several attempts to find a location, the aquarium was built in a remodeled  warehouse in Boise. The aquarium opened to the public on December 16, 2011. It draws about 25,000 visitors per month, including school groups, community organizations, and visitors from across the states of Idaho, Utah, Washington, Oregon and California. It was opened as a work-in-progress, with some exhibits still unfinished, but continues to add more exhibits as time goes on. The aquarium was built with roughly $300,000 in small donations and season pass sales, daily admission sales, grants, fundraising, corporate and private parties.

On May 21, 2014, the "Idaho Aquarium" officially changed its name to the "Aquarium of Boise".  This was a part of a larger restructuring process that included a new board of directors, CEO and COO, with the mission to maintain and strengthen the organization as a vital educational part of the community.

Mission
The mission of the aquarium is to educate and inspire the conservation and enhancement of terrestrial and aquatic ecosystems through hands-on interaction.  The aquarium strives to enhance the quality of life for all terrestrial and aquatic animals by teaching and inspiring people of all ages to better understand, care for, and conserve all life on our planet to ensure a greater future for us all.

The Aquarium of Boise is compliant with regulatory agencies, which include the U.S. Fish and Wildlife Service, Idaho Fish and Game, Idaho Department of Agriculture, U.S. Department of Agriculture's (APHIS program) and the Idaho Humane Society.

Features

The Aquarium of Boise is designed primarily around interactive touch tanks. Its main exhibits feature a shark nursery, coral reef habitat, shark and stingray pool, a jellyfish tank, a giant octopus tank, and tide pools. The interactive exhibits include opportunities for visitors to touch or hold animals such as coral, starfish, crabs, sharks and rays.  The aquarium also exhibits terrestrial and arboreal animals, such as lories, tree frogs and chameleons.

The aquarium continues to grow and develop its plans for expansion, with the addition of 5,000 sq. feet of additional space, and adding a new Marine Science Academy, Reptile exhibits, Octopus exhibit, bird aviary and Marine Science Laboratory.

Notes

External links

Non-profit organizations based in Idaho
Tourist attractions in Boise, Idaho
Buildings and structures in Boise, Idaho
Aquaria in Idaho